Xiaojing Yan (simplified Chinese 闫晓静, last name is Yan) is a contemporary Chinese Canadian artist known for her work in sculpture, installation and public art.

Early life and career
Xiaojing Yan (born 1978, Jiangsu, China) received her Bachelors in Decorative Art from Nanjing Arts Institute in 2000. In 2004 she received degree from George Brown College and in 2007 she received an MFA degree in sculpture from Indiana University of Pennsylvania, United States.

As an artist migrating from China to North America, both her identity and her work pass through the complex filters of different countries, languages, and cultural expectations. Yan has exhibited at Maison Hermès Shanghai, Suzhou Museum, Royal Ontario Museum, Varley Art Gallery, TRUCK Contemporary Art, Calgary; Plug In Contemporary, Winnipeg; Surrey Art Gallery, Surrey; Varley Art Gallery in Markham. Her work was featured at Toronto International Art Fair in 2012 and 2014.

Yan was commissioned by Hermès  to design the 2019 summer window  for Maison Hermès  in Shanghai accompanied by her solo exhibition in the Maison. In 2021, Hermès commissioned her to create “Emergence” a permeant installation for the new store in Shanghai.

Work 
"Yan’s poetic explorations delve into the meaning of spirituality and the transformation of self. Yan draws on personal experience from her earlier life in China and eventual immigration to Canada in reimagining these traditional visual languages through a contemporary perspective." In her 2018 exhibition In Suspended Silence, at the Richmond Art Gallery in British Columbia, Canada, "Yan combined two bodies of work that derive from classical Chinese ink wash painting and portrait sculpture." "It is through the use of traditional Chinese materials and art-historical references that her work navigates a transformative space between culture and identity. "

“Lingzhi Girl” #10, one of Yan’s iconic works, made the cover of Art in America March 2022 issue. This series of evocative figures of human and animal forms inspired by Chinese mythology and folktales. Yan cultivate lingzhi mushroom sculptures form the mould she created through a painstaking, suspenseful experiment by mixing the mushroom spores and woodchips together and incubating the blend in a specially constructed mold. Carefully controlling humidity, temperature and light, a lingzhi mycelium starts to grow and once it has assumed the proper shape and a viable state, the mold is removed. The fragile sculpture, with its mushroom surface, continues to evolve. No longer controlled by the artist but assuming a form determined by nature, it might be considered a collaboration classified as a combination of art, science experiment, and natural process. “In this series, Yan’s investigations, in which metaphoric and physical worlds quietly interpenetrate each other, delve into the meaning of spirituality and metamorphoses, as well as raising other questions about being and becoming through the lens of art and nature, art and science, art and culture and their interconnections. ” - Lilly Wei

Solo exhibitions

2021 Pines, Needles, Mushrooms, Ink, Paint, Chinese American Arts Council/Gallery 456, New York City, USA. Curated by Lilly Wei         
2019 Dreamland, Hermès Maison, Shanghai, China, together with the "Into the Dreams" window display
2019 A Wanderer’s Mind, Art Gallery of Northumberland, Cobourg, ON, Canada
2018 In Suspended Silence, Richmond Art Gallery, Richmond, BC, Canada 
2018 Auspicious Omens, Suzhou Museum, Suzhou, China
2017 Out From Among the Tranquil Woods, Varley Art Gallery, Markham, Ontario, Canada
2017 Between the Water and Mountains, Zhangjiagang Museum, Zhangjiagang, China
2017 Floating, Durham Art Gallery, Durham, Ontario, Canada
2015 Hybrid Vigour, The Latcham Gallery, Stouffville, Canada
2015 Cloud Cell,  Red Head Gallery, Toronto, Canada
2015 New Growth-Breath in Unison, Orleans Gallery, Ottawa School of Art, Canada
2014 Red and White Melody, +15 WINDOW SPACE, Truck Contemporary Art Gallery, Calgary, Canada
2014 Innocence & Experience, Lonsdale Gallery, Toronto, Canada
2012 A Grasp of Shadows, Red Head Gallery, Toronto, Canada
2011 New Growth, Glenhyrst Art Gallery of Brant, Brantford, Canada
2011 Bridge, Artspace, Peterborough, Canada

Select group exhibitions 

 2022 The Art of Living on Community, Immigration, and the Migration of Symbols, Canadian Culture Centre,  Paris, France
 2022 Tiger Show, Meili Ruins Museum, Wuxi, China
 2021 Qi of Water, Art Gallery of Mississauga, ON, Canada
 2020 The 5th Documentary Exhibition of Fine Arts – Physis: Production of Nature, Human and Technology, Hubei Museum of Art, Wuhan, China
 2020  If a Turtle Could Talk, Art Museum at the University of Toronto, ON, Canada
 2020  Resistance and Resilience, the Warren G. Flowers Art Gallery, QC, Canada
 2019  Biennale internationale du lin de Portneuf, Québec city, QC, Canada
 2019 The Experiment, Dunlop Art Gallery, RPL Film Theatre, Regina Public Library, Regina, SK, Canada
 2019 Shaping Time, Latcham Art Centre, Stouffville, ON, Canada
 2019 The Experiment, Dunlop Art Gallery, Regina, SK, Canada
 2018 Glimmers of the Radiant Real, The Robert McLaughlin Gallery, Oshawa, ON, Canada. Toured to the McIntosh Gallery, London, ON (2019); the Art Gallery of Peterborough, Peterborough, ON (2019); and The Reach Gallery Museum Abbotsford, BC (2020).
 2018 Convenience, 2018 Myseum Intersections Festival, Toronto, ON Canada
 2017 Into You: Fall in Deep, Humber Galleries, Toronto, ON, Canada
 2012 (Da Bao) (Takeout), Varley Art Gallery, Markham, ON. Toured to the Art Gallery of Mississauga, ON (2012); Plug In Institute of Contemporary Art, Winnipeg, MB (2013); and the Surrey Art Gallery, Surrey, BC, (2014).

Public art 
 2018 Dwelling, City of Burlington Plain Road Public Art, ON, Canada
 2018 Cloudscape, Royal Ontario Museum, Toronto, ON, Canada
 2017 Sound of the Rain, Elora Centre for the Arts, Elora, ON, Canada
 2017 Nature’s Bounty, AquaBlu Condo Development at Town of Grimsby, ON, Canada
 2016 Moon Gate, Permanent Public Art Commissioned by Jinji Lake Art Museum, Suzhou, China
 2013 Couldscape, Seneca College, Toronto, ON, Canada
 2010 Reflection, Downtown Bike Rack design, City of Burlington’s Public Art Program, ON, Canada

Awards 
Yan is the recipient of the 2014 Outstanding Young Alumni Award from Indiana University of Pennsylvania, the 2013 Mandarin Profile Awards of Fairchild TV and The Chalmers Arts Fellowship.

 2021 InStyle Women Increation Prize in Visual Arts
 2018 OAAG Exhibition Installation and Design Award, Ontario Associate of Art Galleries
 2011 Best of Show Award, Annual Juried Exhibition, The Latcham Gallery, Stouffville, Ontario, Canada

References

External links

Xiaojing Yan's interview on Yishu Journal of Contemporary Chinese Art
Cover of Art in American, March 2022 issue

Living people
1978 births
Nanjing University of the Arts alumni
George Brown College alumni
Indiana University of Pennsylvania alumni
21st-century Canadian artists
Artists from Jiangsu
Canadian installation artists
Canadian people of Chinese descent
Canadian women sculptors
Canadian painters
Canadian women painters
Canadian women artists